This was the first edition of the event.

Hsieh Cheng-peng and Yi Chu-huan won the title, defeating Saketh Myneni and Sanam Singh in the final, 6–4, 6–2.

Seeds

Draw

References
 Main Draw

Hong Kong ATP Challenger - Doubles
2015 Doubles